Lloyd Middleton (13 February 1928 – 26 May 2015) was an Australian rules footballer who played with Essendon in the Victorian Football League in 1951.

Sources
 Holmesby, Russell & Main, Jim (2007). The Encyclopedia of AFL Footballers. 7th ed. Melbourne: Bas Publishing.
 
 

1928 births
2015 deaths
Essendon Football Club players
University Blacks Football Club players
Australian rules footballers from Victoria (Australia)